This a list of flags used in Brunei. For more information about the national flag, see Flag of Brunei.

National Flag

Personal Standard

Military

Army

Navy

Air Force

Police

Historical Flags

See also 

 Flag of Brunei
 Emblem of Brunei

References 

Lists and galleries of flags
Flags